Centromere protein A, also known as CENPA, is a protein which in humans is encoded by the CENPA gene. CENPA is a histone H3 variant which is the critical factor determining the kinetochore position(s) on each chromosome in most eukaryotes including humans.

Function 

CENPA is a protein which epigenetically defines the position of the centromere on each chromosome, determining the position of kinetochore assembly and the final site of sister chromatid cohesion during mitosis. This proteins is frequently accompanied by "centrochromatin"-associated changes to canonical histones and is constitutively present in centromeres. The CENPA protein is a histone H3 variant which replaces one or both canonical H3 histones in a subset of nucleosomes within centromeric chromatin.  CENPA has the greatest sequence divergence of the histone H3 variants, with just 48% similarity to canonical histone H3, and has a highly diverged N-terminal tail that lacks many well characterised histone modification sites including H3K4, H3K9 and H3K27.

Unusually for a histone, CENPA nucleosomes are not loaded together with DNA replication and are loaded at different cell cycle stages in different organisms: G1 phase in human, M phase in drosophila, G2 in S. pombe.  To orchestrate this specialised loading there are CENPA-specific histone chaperones: HJURP in human, CAL1 in drosophila and Scm3 in S. pombe.  In most eukaryotes CENPA is loaded into large domains of highly repetitive satellite DNA.  The position of CENPA within satellite DNA are heritable at the protein level through a purely epigenetic mechanism.  This means that the position of CENPA protein binding to the genome is copied upon cell division to the two daughter cells independent of the underlying DNA sequence. Under circumstances in which CENPA is lost from a chromosome a fail-safe mechanism has been described in human cells in which CENPB recruits CENPA via a satellite DNA binding domain to repopulate the centromere with CENPA nucleosomes.

CENPA interacts directly with the inner kinetochore through proteins including CENPC and CENPN.  Through this interaction the microtubules are able to accurately segregate chromosomes during mitosis.

References

External links

Further reading